Port Royal National Park is a national park on the island of Roatán in Honduras. It covers an area of 5 km2 along the south shore of the island's eastern end.

References

National parks of Honduras
Protected areas established in 2010
2010 establishments in Honduras
Roatán
Central American Atlantic moist forests